3000 (three thousand) is the natural number following 2999 and preceding 3001. It is the smallest number requiring thirteen letters in English (when "and" is required from 101 forward).

Selected numbers in the range 3001–3999

3001 to 3099
3001 – super-prime; divides the Euclid number 2999# + 1
3003 – triangular number, only number known to appear eight times in Pascal's triangle; no number is known to appear more than eight times other than 1. (see Singmaster's conjecture)
3019 – super-prime, happy prime
3023 – 84th Sophie Germain prime, 51st safe prime
3025 = 552, sum of the cubes of the first ten integers, centered octagonal number, dodecagonal number
3037 – star number, cousin prime with 3041
3045 – sum of the integers 196 to 210 and sum of the integers 211 to 224
3046 – centered heptagonal number
3052 – decagonal number
3059 – centered cube number
3061 – prime of the form 2p-1
3063 – perfect totient number
3067 – super-prime
3071 – Thabit number
3072 – 3-smooth number (210×3)
3075 – nonagonal number
3078 – 18th pentagonal pyramidal number
3080 – pronic number
3081 – triangular number, 497th sphenic number
3087 – sum of first 40 primes

3100 to 3199
3109 – super-prime
3119 – safe prime
3121 – centered square number, emirp, largest minimal prime in quinary.
3125 – a solution to the expression , where .
3136 = 562, palindromic in ternary (110220113), tribonacci number
3137 – Proth prime, both a left- and right-truncatable prime
3149 – highly cototient number
3155 – member of the Mian–Chowla sequence
3160 – triangular number
3167 – safe prime
3169 – super-prime, Cuban prime of the form .
3192 – pronic number

3200 to 3299
3203 – safe prime
3207 – number of compositions of 14 whose run-lengths are either weakly increasing or weakly decreasing
3229 – super-prime
3240 – triangular number
3248 – member of a Ruth-Aaron pair with 3249 under second definition, largest number whose factorial is less than 1010000 – hence its factorial is the largest certain advanced computer programs can handle.
3249 = 572, palindromic in base 7 (123217), centered octagonal number, member of a Ruth–Aaron pair with 3248 under second definition
3253 – sum of eleven consecutive primes (269 + 271 + 277 + 281 + 283 + 293 + 307 + 311 + 313 + 317 + 331)
3256 – centered heptagonal number
3259 – super-prime, completes the ninth prime quadruplet set
3264 – solution to Steiner's conic problem: number of smooth conics tangent to 5 given conics in general position
3266 – sum of first 41 primes, 523rd sphenic number
3276 – tetrahedral number
3277 – 5th super-Poulet number, decagonal number
3281 – octahedral number, centered square number
3286 – nonagonal number
3299 – 85th Sophie Germain prime, super-prime

3300 to 3399
3301 – a normal prime number
3306 – pronic number
3307 – balanced prime
3313 – balanced prime, star number
3319 – super-prime, happy number
3321 – triangular number
3329 – 86th Sophie Germain prime, Proth prime, member of the Padovan sequence
3354 – member of the Mian–Chowla sequence
3358 – sum of the squares of the first eleven primes
3359 – 87th Sophie Germain prime, highly cototient number
3363/2378 ≈ √2
3364 = 582
3367 = 153 -  23 = 163 -  93 = 343 - 333
3375 = 153, palindromic in base 14 (133114), 15th cube
3389 – 88th Sophie Germain prime

3400 to 3499
3403 – triangular number
3407 – super-prime
3413 – 89th Sophie Germain prime, sum of the first 5 nn: 3413 = 11 + 22 + 33 + 44 + 55
3422 – pronic number, 553rd sphenic number, melting point of tungsten in degrees Celsius
3435 – a perfect digit-to-digit invariant, equal to the sum of its digits to their own powers (33 + 44 + 33 + 55 = 3435)
3439 – magic constant of n×n normal magic square and n-queens problem for n = 19.
3445 – centered square number
3447 – sum of first 42 primes
3449 – 90th Sophie Germain prime
3456 – 3-smooth number (27×33)
3457 – Proth prime
3463 – happy number
3467 – safe prime
3469 – super-prime, Cuban prime of the form x = y + 2, completes the tenth prime quadruplet set
3473 – centered heptagonal number
3481 = 592, centered octagonal number
3486 – triangular number
3491 – 91st Sophie Germain prime

3500 to 3599
3504 – nonagonal number
3510 – decagonal number
3511 – largest known Wieferich prime
3512 – number of primes .
3517 – super-prime, sum of nine consecutive primes (367 + 373 + 379 + 383 + 389 + 397 + 401 + 409 + 419)
3539 – 92nd Sophie Germain prime
3540 – pronic number
3559 – super-prime
3569 – highly cototient number
3570 – triangular number
3571 – 500th prime, Cuban prime of the form x = y + 1, 17th Lucas number, 4th balanced prime of order 4.
3591 – member of the Mian–Chowla sequence
3593 – 93rd Sophie Germain prime, super-prime

3600 to 3699
3600 = 602, number of seconds in an hour, called šār or šāru in the sexagesimal system of Ancient Mesopotamia (cf. Saros), 1201-gonal number
3601 – star number
3610 – 19th pentagonal pyramidal number
3613 – centered square number
3617 – sum of eleven consecutive primes (293 + 307 + 311 + 313 + 317 + 331 + 337 + 347 + 349 + 353 + 359)
3623 – 94th Sophie Germain prime, safe prime
3637 – balanced prime, super-prime
3638 – sum of first 43 primes, 599th sphenic number
3643 – happy number, sum of seven consecutive primes (499 + 503 + 509 + 521 + 523 + 541 + 547)
3654 – tetrahedral number
3655 – triangular number, 601st sphenic number
3660 – pronic number
3684 – 13th Keith number
3697 – centered heptagonal number

3700 to 3799
3721 = 612, centered octagonal number
3729 – nonagonal number
3733 – balanced prime, super-prime
3741 – triangular number, 618th sphenic number
3751 – decagonal number
3761 – 95th Sophie Germain prime, super-prime
3779 – 96th Sophie Germain prime, safe prime
3782 – pronic number, 623rd sphenic number
3785 – centered square number
3797 – member of the Mian–Chowla sequence, both a left- and right- truncatable prime

3800 to 3899
3803 – 97th Sophie Germain prime, safe prime, the largest prime factor of 123,456,789
3821 – 98th Sophie Germain prime
3828 – triangular number
3831 – sum of first 44 primes
3844 = 622
3851 – 99th Sophie Germain prime
3863 – 100th Sophie Germain prime
3865 – greater of third pair of Smith brothers
3888 – longest number when expressed in Roman numerals I, V, X, L, C, D, and M (MMMDCCCLXXXVIII), 3-smooth number (24×35)
3889 – Cuban prime of the form x = y + 2
3894 – octahedral number

3900 to 3999
3901 – star number
3906 – pronic number
3911 – 101st Sophie Germain prime, super-prime
3916 – triangular number
3925 – centered cube number
3926 – 12th open meandric number, 654th sphenic number
3928 – centered heptagonal number
3937 – product of distinct Mersenne primes, repeated sum of divisors is prime, denominator of conversion factor from meter to US survey foot
3940 – there are 3940 distinct ways to arrange the 12 flat pentacubes (or 3-D pentominoes) into a 3x4x5 box (not counting rotations and reflections)
3943 – super-prime
3947 – safe prime
3961 – nonagonal number, centered square number
3969 = 632, centered octagonal number
3989 – highly cototient number
3998 – member of the Mian–Chowla sequence
3999 – largest number properly expressible using Roman numerals I, V, X, L, C, D, and M (MMMCMXCIX), ignoring vinculum

Prime numbers
There are 120 prime numbers between 3000 and 4000:
3001, 3011, 3019, 3023, 3037, 3041, 3049, 3061, 3067, 3079, 3083, 3089, 3109, 3119, 3121, 3137, 3163, 3167, 3169, 3181, 3187, 3191, 3203, 3209, 3217, 3221, 3229, 3251, 3253, 3257, 3259, 3271, 3299, 3301, 3307, 3313, 3319, 3323, 3329, 3331, 3343, 3347, 3359, 3361, 3371, 3373, 3389, 3391, 3407, 3413, 3433, 3449, 3457, 3461, 3463, 3467, 3469, 3491, 3499, 3511, 3517, 3527, 3529, 3533, 3539, 3541, 3547, 3557, 3559, 3571, 3581, 3583, 3593, 3607, 3613, 3617, 3623, 3631, 3637, 3643, 3659, 3671, 3673, 3677, 3691, 3697, 3701, 3709, 3719, 3727, 3733, 3739, 3761, 3767, 3769, 3779, 3793, 3797, 3803, 3821, 3823, 3833, 3847, 3851, 3853, 3863, 3877, 3881, 3889, 3907, 3911, 3917, 3919, 3923, 3929, 3931, 3943, 3947, 3967, 3989

References

Integers